Two ships of the Royal Navy have borne the name HMS St John:

  was a schooner purchased in 1764 and condemned in 1777.
  was a cutter purchased in 1780 and listed until 1781.

See also
  was an advice boat captured from the French in 1695 but recaptured in 1696.

Royal Navy ship names